Alizée Dufraisse (born 13 June 1987 in Pessac, France) is a French professional rock climber. She lives in Aix-en-Provence. She has been climbing since the age of seven.

In January 2012, she climbed La Reina Mora , which had been only climbed by three other climbers Ramón Julián Puigblanque, Daniel Andrada, and Nicolas Favresse, and was considered by some to be close to a full 9a (that would have been the fourth-ever female ascent of a 9a in history).

In 2008, she was a gold medalist in the French championship. In 2009, she won the bouldering competition at Rock Master. In 2010, she won a bronze medal at the European Championships in Imst Austria.

She is also interested in other sports, including the pole vault.

References

External links
 

 

1987 births
Living people
French rock climbers
French female mountain climbers
French female pole vaulters
21st-century French women